Stanley Gordon Whight (2 May 1907 – 21 January 1977) was  a former Australian rules footballer who played with Footscray in the Victorian Football League (VFL).

Notes

External links 
		

1907 births
1977 deaths
Australian rules footballers from Victoria (Australia)
Western Bulldogs players
Yarraville Football Club players